Ján Tkáč (born 10 May 1972) in Poprad is a Slovak chemist known for being the first Slovak scientist based in Slovakia to receive the European Research Council grant.

Tkáč got his PhD in Chemistry in 2000 at the Slovak University of Technology in Bratislava. Following his graduation, he shortly worked at the Slovak Academy of Sciences and then abroad at Linköping University (2001-2003), Lund University (2003-2006, supported by the Marie Curie Individual Fellowship) and at Oxford (2006-2008). In 2012, he returned to the Slovak Academy of Sciences with a European Research Council grant.

Tkáč's research focuses on  the research of glycans for the diagnosis of some oncological diseases.

In 2018, he received European Research Council Proof of Concept grant with his new start up Glycanostics.

References 

People from Poprad
Slovak University of Technology in Bratislava alumni
European Research Council grantees
Slovak chemists
Living people
1972 births